Eureka or Eureka Landing, is a former mining town and steamboat landing, now a ghost town, on the Arizona bank of the Colorado River in what is now La Paz County, Arizona.  It was originally located in Yuma County, Arizona from 1863 through the 1870s.

History
In the fall of 1863, the Eureka Mining District was formed when silver strikes were made in the Chocolate Mountains of Arizona.  Eureka Landing and Williamsport grew serving these new mines in the district.  The landings and mining district appear in the 1865 Map of the new Arizona Territory.  Eureka was a small cluster of adobe buildings on the riverbank, 45 miles up river from Arizona City and 2 miles down river from Williamsport.  Across the river was the Picacho Mining District.

Today
Today the Eureka Landing on the riverbank has disappeared.

References

External links
  Official Map Of The Territory Of Arizona, With All The Recent Explorations. Compiled by Richard Gird C.E. Commissioner. Approved By John N. Goodwin, Governor. In Accordance With An Act Of The Legislature, Approved Oct. 23d. 1864. We hereby certify that this is the Official Map of the Territory of Arizona, and approve the same. Prescott October 12th 1865. (with signed seal dated 1863). Published By A. Gensoul, Pacific Map Depot. No. 511 Montgomery St. San Francisco. Lith. Britton & Co. San Francisco.  Accessed from www.davidrumsey.com, December 1, 2014. Shows location of Eureka, Williamsporth and the Eureka District, and other landings, settlements and mining districts along the Colorado River and the interior of the territory in 1865.
 The Riverview(Eureka)Mine, Imperial Wildlife Refuge, La Paz County Arizona

Ghost towns in Arizona
Former populated places in La Paz County, Arizona
Port cities and towns in Arizona